This is a list of records and statistics of the football tournament in the Olympic games ever since the inaugural official edition in 1908.

Medal table 
 Bronze medals shared in 1972 tournament

Top scorers by tournament

Records 
Starting with the first official football tournament in London in 1908, Denmark's Sophus Nielsen and Hungary's Antal Dunai share the record for the most total goals scored by a player in tournament history. Both have 13 goals: Nielsen scored 11 goals in 1908 and two in 1912, and Dunai scored six in 1968 and seven in 1972. Ferenc Bene holds the record for the most goals scored by a player in a single Olympics tournament, scoring 12 goals in the 1964 edition. Sophus Nielsen and Gottfried Fuchs share the record for most goals scored in a single Olympic match at 10. Nielson achieved that in the semi-final match against France in 1908, and Fuchs did so in the first-round match against Russia in the 1912 consolation tournament.

Neymar scored the fastest goal in a men's Olympic football match in history, 14 seconds into the semi-final match against Honduras on 17 August 2016.

All-time top scorers 
The all-time top goalscorers with at least 7 goals (since 1908)

Hat-tricks 

Since the first official tournament in 1908 in England, 99 hat-tricks have been scored in over 1,000 matches of the 25 editions of the tournament.

Teams: tournament position
Teams having equal quantities in the tables below are ordered by the tournament the quantity was attained in (the teams that attained the quantity first are listed first). If the quantity was attained by more than one team in the same tournament, these teams are ordered alphabetically.

 Most titles won 3,  (1952, 1964, 1968).
 Most finishes in the top three 7,  (1984, 1988, 1996, 2008, 2012, 2016, 2020).
 Most finishes in the top four 8,  (1976, 1984, 1988, 1996, 2008, 2012, 2016, 2020).
 Most appearances 15,  (1912, 1920, 1924, 1928,  1936, 1948, 1952, 1960, 1984, 1988, 1992, 1996, 2000, 2004, 2008).

Consecutive
 Most consecutive medals 4,  (1948–52–56–60); (1960–64–68–72);  (2008–12–16–20).
 Most consecutive golds 2,  (1908–12);  (1924–28);  (1964–68);  (2004–08);  (2016–20).
 Most consecutive silvers 3,  (1948–52–56).
 Most consecutive bronzes 3,  (1908–12–20).
 Most consecutive top three finishes 3,  (1972–1980).
 Most consecutive championships by a confederation 13, UEFA, (1936–1992).
 Most consecutive matches won 12  (2004–2008), six in each tournament.

Gaps
 Longest gap between titles 32 years,  (1956–1988).
 Longest gap between appearances in the top two 72 years,  (1920–1992).

Host team
 Best finish by host team Champion:  (1908);  (1920);  (1992);  (2016).

Other
 Most finishes in the top two without ever being champion 3,  (1908, 1912, 1960).
 Most finishes in the top three without ever being champion 4,  (1908, 1912, 1948, 1960).
 Most finishes in the top four without ever being champion 4,  (1908, 1912, 1920, 1924);  (1908, 1912, 1948, 1960).

Teams: matches played and goals scored

All time
 Most matches played 66, .
 Most wins 38, .
 Most losses 23, .
 Most draws 13, .
 Most goals scored 134, .
 Most goals conceded 102, .
 Fewest goals conceded 1, .

Individual
 Most matches played, finals 13, Dezső Novák (1960–1968); Antal Dunai (1964–1972); Lajos Szűcs (1968–1972); Miklós Páncsics (1968–1972).

Players who won Summer Olympics and FIFA World Cup

Goalscoring

Individual
 Most goals scored, overall finals 13, Sophus Nielsen, 1908–1912; Antal Dunai, 1964-1972.
 Most goals scored in a tournament 12, Ferenc Bene, 1964.
 Most goals scored in a match 10, Sophus Nielsen, vs France, 1908; Gottfried Fuchs, vs Russia, 1912.
 First goalscorer Nils Middelboe, vs France, 19 October 1908.
 Youngest goalscorer , Ángel Uribe, vs France, 26 August 1960.
 Oldest goalscorer , Ryan Giggs, vs United Arab Emirates, 29 July 2012.

Team
 Most goals scored in a match, one team 17,  vs , 1908.
 Most goals scored in a match, both teams 18,  (17) vs  (1), 1908.
 Highest scoring draw 5–5,  vs , 1952.
 Fewest goals conceded in a tournament 0,  in Athens 2004

Tournament
 Most goals scored in a tournament 135 goals, 1952; 1972.
 Fewest goals scored in a tournament 48 goals, 1908.
 Most goals per match in a tournament 8.00 goals per match, 1908.
 Fewest goals per match in a tournament 2.34 goals per match, 2008.

Winning managers

Managers who won Summer Olympics and FIFA World Cup

Discipline
 Most sendings off (all-time, team) 6, .
 Most cautions (all-time, team) 91, .

Attendance
 Highest average of attendance per match 47,660, 2012.
 Lowest average of attendance per match 3,333, 1908.

Footnotes

References

See also
 List of men's Olympic football tournament hat-tricks
 List of women's Olympic football tournament records

Olympic football records and statistics